Deepali Noor is an Indian fashion designer. She was born in Mumbai, Maharashtra. She was involved in advertising and modelling before joining the fashion industry.

Achievements
Deepali has won several awards for her work. She won the Vijay Award for Best Costume Designer for her work in the film Madrasapattinam in 2012. She was also nominated for the same award for her work in Nanban (film) in 2010. She also won the Ananda Vikatan award in the year 2012 and the Norway Tamil Film Festival Awards for Best Costume Design in the year 2011 for her work in Madrasapattinam.

References

Year of birth missing (living people)
Living people
Indian women fashion designers
21st-century Indian designers
21st-century Indian women artists